Monsters is a 2015 Chinese suspense horror thriller film directed by Guo Hua. It was released in China on June 5, 2015.

Plot

Cast
Liu Qing
Zhou Haodong
Wu Yanyan
Zhao Qianzi
Yu Zijian
Shang Hong
Li Wenjie
Luo Xuan

Box-Office
By June 5, 2015, the film had earned  at the Chinese box office.

References

2015 horror thriller films
2015 horror films
Chinese horror thriller films
2010s monster movies